Mountainous Landscape with Figures and a Donkey (Russian: Горный пейзаж с упавшим ослом) is an oil on canvas painting by Flemish painter Joos de Momper. The painting was completed in the early 17th century and is currently housed at the Hermitage Museum in Saint Petersburg.

Painting
The oeuvre was acquired by the Hermitage Museum in 1886. The painting was once part of the Golitsyn collection at the Golitsyn Museum, one of the first museums of Western European art to open in Russia in 1865.

References

Further reading

External links
The painting at the Web Gallery of Art
Painting at the Hermitage Museum official website

16th-century paintings
17th-century paintings
Landscape paintings
Paintings by Joos de Momper
Paintings in Saint Petersburg
Paintings in Russia
Paintings in the collection of the Hermitage Museum